Two in Clover is a British sitcom that ran for two series from 1969 to 1970.  It starred Sid James and Victor Spinetti and was written by Vince Powell and Harry Driver, and produced and directed by Alan Tarrant. The first series was made in black and white and the second series was made in colour.

It was made by Thames Television for the ITV network.

Plot
Two city clerks, Sid Turner (James) and Vic Evans (Spinetti), abandon the nine-to-five to run a small farm out in the country. A recurring theme throughout the two series was Sid's love of his Friesian cow "Fanny".

Cast
Sidney James - Sid Turner
Victor Spinetti - Vic Evans
Gerald Flood - Gerald Bromley-Jones
Victor Platt - Landlord
Bill Pertwee - Policeman
James Beck - Dr. Molineux
John Inman - Bowler
Fred Trueman - Himself

Episodes

Series One (1969)

1.1. Series 1, Episode 1 (18 February 1969)
1.2. Series 1, Episode 2 (25 February 1969)
1.3. Series 1, Episode 3 (4 March 1969)
1.4. Series 1, Episode 4 (11 March 1969)
1.5. Series 1, Episode 5 (18 March 1969)
1.6. Series 1, Episode 6 (25 March 1969)
1.7. Series 1, Episode 7 (1 April 1969)

Series Two (1970)

2.1. Series 2, Episode 1 (10 February 1970)
2.2. Series 2, Episode 2 (17 February 1970)
2.3. Series 2, Episode 3 (24 February 1970)
2.4. Series 2, Episode 4 (3 March 1970)
2.5. Series 2, Episode 5 (17 March 1970)
2.6. Series 2, Episode 6 (24 March 1970)

DVD releases
Both series of Two in Clover have been released on DVD by Network in 2004.

External links

1969 British television series debuts
1970 British television series endings
1960s British sitcoms
1970s British sitcoms
ITV sitcoms
Television shows produced by Thames Television
Television series by Fremantle (company)
English-language television shows